Dale Ellcock (born 16 November 1967) is a Barbadian cricketer. He played in four first-class and three List A matches for the Barbados cricket team in 1986/87.

See also
 List of Barbadian representative cricketers

References

External links
 

1967 births
Living people
Barbadian cricketers
Barbados cricketers
Cricketers from Bridgetown